The Speaker of the Northern Territory Legislative Assembly is the presiding officer in the Northern Territory Legislative Assembly. Though the office had existed since the creation of the Assembly in 1974, it was given greater legislative force when the roles and functions of the office were included in the federal Act that gave the Territory self-government in 1978.

The Speaker's principal duty is to preside over the Assembly. The occupant of the Chair must maintain order in the House, uphold the Standing Orders (rules of procedure) and protect the rights of backbench members.

The Speaker must be a member of the Assembly themselves, and is elected to the position by a ballot of the members of the Assembly. It is generally a partisan position, although both Speaker and Deputy Speaker were independents between 2001 and 2005.

Speakers of the Northern Territory Legislative Assembly

References

External links
 Members of the Legislative Assembly: 1974 to 21 July 2010

Northern Territory